Great Britain competed at the 2012 Winter Youth Olympics in Innsbruck, Austria. The British team consisted of 24 athletes competing in 10 different sports.

Medalists

Mica McNeill and Jazmin Sawyers, in the two-girl Bobsled, won Great Britain's only medal at the Games.

In addition, two British athletes won medals as part of mixed nationality teams in short track speed skating.

Alpine skiing

Boys

Girls

Biathlon

Boys

Bobsleigh

Boys

Girls

Cross country skiing

Boys

Girls

Sprint

Curling

Boys
Skip: Duncan Menzies
Second: Thomas Muirhead

Girls
Third: Angharad Ward
Lead: Rachel Hannen

Mixed Team

Round-robin results

Draw 1

Draw 2

Draw 3

Draw 4

Draw 5

Draw 6

Draw 7

Mixed doubles

Round of 32

Round of 16

Quarterfinals

Figure skating

Pairs

Mixed

Freestyle skiing

Ski Half-Pipe

Ice hockey

Boys

Girls

Short track speed skating

Boys

Mixed

Snowboarding

Boys

See also
Great Britain at the 2012 Summer Olympics

References

2012 in British sport
Nations at the 2012 Winter Youth Olympics
Winter sports in the United Kingdom
Great Britain at the Youth Olympics